The State Committee on Religious Associations of the Republic of Azerbaijan is a central executive body which ensures implementation of the state policy and laws in the field of religion. The State Committee was established on June 21, 2001.

State Committee chairs
Rafiq Aliyev — 21 June 2001 - 25 June 2006
Hidayat Orujov — 25 June 2006 - 31 May 2012
Elshad Iskandarov — 31 May 2012 - 2 May 2014
Mubariz Qurbanli — 21 July 2014 -

References

Government agencies of Azerbaijan
Government agencies established in 2001
2001 establishments in Azerbaijan
Religion in Azerbaijan